The Wicklow Reef is a shallow subtidal reef in the Irish Sea, located off the coast of County Wicklow, Ireland, approximately  northeast of Wicklow Head.

Prior to the discovery of the Wicklow Reef in 1997, Sabellaria alveolata reefs were only known to occur in inter-tidal zones along the coasts of Britain and Ireland. Sub-tidal reefs are exceptionally rare in the region, being typically found in the Mediterranean. The Wicklow Reef is the first and only known example of a sub-tidal Sabellaria alveolata reef off the coast of Britain and Ireland.

The reef is home to a number of species of crab, starfish, sea-squirts, brittlestars, as well as molluscs and bryozoans. Several species of worm such as Phaeostachys spinifera, Eulalia ornata and Unciola crenatipalma are very uncommon in Irish waters, and the Wicklow Reef is therefore considered a priority habitat. The reef is an EU-designated Special Area of Conservation.

Reef species

See also
List of Special Areas of Conservation in the Republic of Ireland

References

Geography of County Wicklow
Tourist attractions in County Wicklow
Special Areas of Conservation in the Republic of Ireland
Reefs